Gymnachirus melas, the North American naked sole, also known as the naked sole, is a species of sole in the family Achiridae. It was described by John Treadwell Nichols in 1916. It is known from Mexico, Cuba, the Bahamas, and the United States.

Due to a lack of known threats to its population, the North American naked sole is currently ranked as Least Concern by the IUCN redlist. It is caught as bycatch in shrimp and other trawls. It is of minor interest in commercial fisheries.

References

Pleuronectiformes
Taxa named by John Treadwell Nichols
Fish described in 1916